Halton West is a village and civil parish in the Craven district of North Yorkshire, England. North Yorkshire County Council estimated the population in 2015 at 70.

The place was first recorded in about 1200 as Halton.  The name is derived from the Old English halh 'nook' and tūn 'farm or village', so means 'farm or village in or by a nook'. "West" was added to distinguish the village from another Halton, now Halton East,  to the east.

Halton West, historically also known as West Halton, was a township in the ancient parish of Long Preston in the West Riding of Yorkshire.  It became a civil parish in 1866, and in 1974 was transferred to the new county of North Yorkshire.

Halton Place 
Halton Place is a large country house just east of the village.  It was built in 1770 by Thomas Yorke (1738-1811), whose father Thomas Yorke (1688–1768) had acquired the estate in 1732.  It remains in the Yorke family to the present day. It was designated a Grade II listed building in 1958.

References

External links

Villages in North Yorkshire
Civil parishes in North Yorkshire